State Route 136 (SR 136) is a primary state highway in the U.S. state of Virginia.  The state highway runs  from SR 652 east to U.S. Route 1 (US 1) within Alberta in northern Brunswick County.

Route description

SR 136 begins at the western town limit of Alberta.  The road continues west as SR 652 (Chalk Level Road), which connects the town to SR 46.  The state highway starts as School Street, then passes through a sharp S-curve and continues as 2nd Avenue to the center of town.  In the eastern part of the town, SR 136 turns south onto Church Street to reach its eastern terminus at US 1 (Boydton Plank Road).

Major intersections

References

External links

Virginia Highways Project: VA 136

136
State Route 136